Katrina Williams may refer to:

 Kat Williams, American blues singer
 Katrina Williams (civil servant), British civil servant